Submarine Squadron 11 (also known as SUBRON 11) is a squadron of submarines based at Point Loma Submarine Base, San Diego, California, United States. Submarine Squadron 11 was commissioned July 1, 1986, aboard her flagship, at Naval Submarine Base Point Loma, San Diego. Their missions include anti-submarine, anti-surface, strike, special and mine warfare, intelligence, surveillance and reconnaissance. The squadron currently consists of four Los Angeles-class submarines for deployments to the Western Pacific, Indian Ocean and the Persian Gulf.

History 
Submarine Squadron 11 is a squadron of submarines based in San Diego, California. It consists of four s, a floating dry-dock, and Undersea Rescue Command. The squadron staff is responsible for providing training, material and personnel readiness support for all units. Submarine Squadron 11 is located on Naval Base Point Loma in San Diego, Calif.

Submarine Squadron 11 was commissioned July 1, 1986, aboard her flagship, at Naval Submarine Base Point Loma, San Diego.

Over the years, Squadron 11 has continued to evolve. Older submarines have transferred, or been decommissioned, henceforth the squadron has received newer submarines with upgraded sensors and weapons capability. Squadron 11 submarines represent the most advanced submarine technology and are among the most capable and clean attack submarines in the world.

Submarine Squadron 11 units maintain a very aggressive operational schedule, including training and operations with other ships in the Southern California operating area, independent operations to enhance readiness and deployments to the Western Pacific, Indian Ocean and the Persian Gulf. Their missions include anti-submarine, anti-surface, strike, special and mine warfare, intelligence, surveillance and reconnaissance.

On March 13, 2023, Squadron 11 was visited by President Joe Biden along with the prime ministers of Australia and the United Kingdom. The occasion was to announce an agreement among the allies to provide nuclear-powered attack submarines to Australia. This is believed to be the first time a sitting president has visited Naval Base Point Loma since its establishment in 1998.

Assignments
The submarines that make up SUBRON 11 include:

Support vessels 
  Floating Drydock

Commanders 
CAPT Rich Correll

CAPT Thomas Ishee

CAPT Eugene Doyle

CAPT Brian Davies - February 2016 to August 2017

CAPT Chris Cavanaugh - August 2017 to August 2019

CAPT Patrick Friedman - August 2019 to Present

Submarines that have historically belonged to SUBRON 11

USS Barb (SSN-596)

Support ships or vessels that have historically belonged to SUBRON 11
  Submarine Tender
  Submarine Tender
  Submarine Tender

References

External links
 

Submarine squadrons of the United States Navy
Point Loma, San Diego
Military units and formations established in 1986